Leiodytes is a genus of beetles in the family Dytiscidae, containing the following species:

 Leiodytes acutus Wang, Satô & P.-S.Yang, 1998
 Leiodytes atomus (Régimbart, 1877)
 Leiodytes australis Biström, 1987
 Leiodytes bicolor (Biström, 1988)
 Leiodytes camerunensis Biström, 1987
 Leiodytes demoulini (Guignot, 1955)
 Leiodytes evanescens (Boheman, 1848)
 Leiodytes frontalis (Sharp, 1884)
 Leiodytes gracilis (Gschwendtner, 1933)
 Leiodytes griseoguttatus (Régimbart, 1893)
 Leiodytes guttulatus (Régimbart, 1891)
 Leiodytes hieroglyphicus (Régimbart, 1894)
 Leiodytes horai (Vazirani, 1969)
 Leiodytes imitator Biström, 1987
 Leiodytes indicus (Régimbart, 1892)
 Leiodytes javanus (Régimbart, 1899)
 Leiodytes kyushuensis (Nakane, 1990)
 Leiodytes lanyuensis Wang, Satô & P.-S.Yang, 1998
 Leiodytes marginicollis (Régimbart, 1895)
 Leiodytes minutus (Vazirani, 1969)
 Leiodytes miyamotoi (Nakane, 1990)
 Leiodytes nicobaricus (Redtenbacher, 1867)
 Leiodytes oblongus (Régimbart, 1899)
 Leiodytes orissaensis (Vazirani, 1969)
 Leiodytes perforatus (Sharp, 1882)
 Leiodytes regimbarti (Guignot, 1936)
 Leiodytes similis Biström, 1993
 Leiodytes vietnamensis Wang, Satô & P.-S.Yang, 1998

References

Dytiscidae